Urechis unicinctus, known as the fat innkeeper worm  or penis fish, is a species of marine spoon worm in East Asia. It is found in Bohai Gulf of China and off the Korean and Hokkaido coasts. It is not to be confused with a closely related species, Urechis caupo, which occurs on the western coast of North America and shares common names. The body is about 10–30 cm long, cylindrical in shape and yellowish-brown in color. On the surface of the body there are many small papillae.

Ecology
This spoonworm is a detritivore, feeding on detritus and lives and burrows in sand and mud like other Urechis species. It creates a U-shaped burrow in the soft sediment of the seabed. A ring of glands at the front of the proboscis secrete mucus which sticks to the burrow wall. The worm continues to exude mucus as it moves backwards in the burrow thus creating a mucus net. The worm draws water through its burrow by peristaltic contractions of its body and food particles adhere to the net. When enough food is gathered, the worm moves forward in its burrow and swallows the net and entangled food. This process is repeated, and in an area with plenty of detritus, may be completed in only a few minutes.

Large numbers have been known to become stranded on beaches in Japan, but further studies must be dedicated as to why. The original theory was that it was beached solely due to sea storms, but scientists also theorize that they swim at night to reproduce, which would raise the chances of beachings.

Uses
In Korea, they are eaten as food, often raw with salt and sesame oil or gochujang. They are distributed in Korea, Hokkaido, and the Pacific coast.

In Chinese cuisine, the worm is stir-fried with vegetables, or dried and powdered to be used as an umami enhancer.

It is also used as fishing bait for fish such as flounder and sea bream.

References

External links
 5 Korean foods for adventurous eaters Chincha.co.uk

Echiurans
Korean seafood
Shandong cuisine